The Paper Chase is a 1956 mystery crime novel by the British writer Julian Symons. It was published in America the following year by Harper & Brothers under the alternative title of Bogue's Fortune. It was reviewed by fellow writers Milward Kennedy in The Guardian and Philip John Stead in the Times Literary Supplement.

Synopsis
A crime writer looking for new material for his second novel, decides to set it in a progressive school and gets a job in one to help his research. Before long a murder takes place and he is drawn into an investigation about an alleged stash of treasure hidden by the school's previous headmaster, the mysterious Johnny Bogue who died in a plane crash more than a decade earlier.

References

Bibliography
 Bargainnier, Earl F. Twelve Englishmen of Mystery. Popular Press, 1984.
 Walsdorf, John J. & Allen, Bonnie J. Julian Symons: A Bibliography. Oak Knoll Press, 1996.
Watson, George & Willison, Ian R. The New Cambridge Bibliography of English Literature, Volume 4. CUP, 1972.

1956 British novels
Novels by Julian Symons
British crime novels
British mystery novels
British thriller novels
William Collins, Sons books
Novels set in England